Achas que Sabes Dançar is a televised dance competition that was aired on Portugal's SIC network in spring and summer of 2010.  It has a format similar to that of other shows in the international So You Think You Can Dance television franchise, of which it is the Portuguese iteration.   The first  season premiered in May 2010 and concluded in July with dancer Marco Ferreira announced winner and awarded a cash prize, a scholarship to a dance school in New York and the title “Portugal's Favorite dancer.” The show was hosted by Portuguese television personality João Manzarra. The second season premiered in January 2015 and was hosted by the actress and TV presenter Diana Chaves.

Winners

Season 1

Judges and Presenter

Contestants

Elimination Chart

Live Performance Shows 

The live performance show (Gala) portion of the competition began on May 30, with a Top 20 dancers.  As with other shows in the So You Think You Can Dance franchise, dancers were paired into couples for duet routines (in styles drawn at random) with home viewers casting votes by phone for their favorite couples and the six dancers from the three couples receiving the lowest number of votes subject to being the two dancers sent home that week by the judge decision.  These six dancers are each afforded one more thirty second solo to help effect this decision.

1st Week (Top 20) – May 30, 2010

2nd Week (Top 18) – June 6, 2010

3rd Week (Top 16) – June 13, 2010

4th Week (Top 14) – June 20, 2010

5th Week (Top 12) – June 27, 2010

6th Week (Top 10) – July 4th, 2010

At this point in the competition new partners began to be assigned weekly, and voting was made by individual dancers rather than for couples. The judge's also lost their authority to choose who would be eliminated from the bottom dancers each week, with eliminations decided solely on viewer votes.  Dance styles continued to be randomly assigned and all remaining dancers  performed a solo each week, regardless of whether they were in the bottom dancers.

7th Week (Top 8) – July 11, 2010

8th Week (Top 6) – July 18, 2010

9th Week (Top 4/Grand Finale) - July 25, 2010 

The Top Four Grand Finale featured the dancers coupled in every combination for duets as well as solo performances.   Marco Ferreira was ultimately announced winner of the competition and “Portugal's Favorite Dancer.”

Season 2

Judges and Presenter

Contestants

Elimination Chart

Live Performance Shows 

The live performance show (Gala) portion of the competition began on May 30, with a Top 20 dancers.  As with other shows in the So You Think You Can Dance franchise, dancers were paired into couples for duet routines (in styles drawn at random) with home viewers casting votes by phone for their favorite couples and the six dancers from the three couples receiving the lowest number of votes subject to being the two dancers sent home that week by the judge decision.  These six dancers are each afforded one more ten second solo to help effect this decision.

1st Week (Top 20) – February 8, 2015

See also
Dance on television

Similar shows
 The Ultimate Dance Battle
 Live to Dance/Got to Dance
 America's Best Dance Crew
 Superstars of Dance
 Dance India Dance
 Se Ela Dança, Eu Danço

References

External links
Official Page
Facebook

So You Think You Can Dance
Dance competition television shows
2010 Portuguese television series debuts
2010 Portuguese television series endings
Portuguese television series based on American television series
Sociedade Independente de Comunicação original programming